Ciarán Ó Cronín (born 1988 in Lisgoold, County Cork) is an Irish sportsperson.

He plays hurling with his local club Lisgoold. He is Goalkeeper for the Lisgoold GAA team since 2004. He was involved in the last Cork School team to win the Harty Cup in 2006 with Midleton CBS. He was a member of the Cork Senior Hurling Team where he was called up due to the 2008 panels strike. He scored a goal from a puck out for his club vs Carrig na bhfear in a league game 2016.

References

1988 births
Living people
Dual players
Hurling goalkeepers
Irish accountants
Cork inter-county hurlers
Lisgoold hurlers